Playing for Keeps is an Australian drama television series, which began airing on Network 10 on 19 September 2018. The series was created from a concept by the network's head of drama Rick Maier. It centres on the wives and girlfriends of the players at the fictional Southern Jets Football Club. Its ensemble cast includes Madeleine West, Annie Maynard, Cece Peters, Olympia Valance, Isabella Giovinazzo, and Jeremy Lindsay Taylor. Playing for Keeps was renewed for a second season, which premiered on 16 October 2019.

Production
On 9 November 2017, the series was announced during Ten's upfronts. It focuses on the women behind the men of an Australian rules football club. The concept for the series was created by Rick Maier, the head of drama at the network. Playing for Keeps is produced by Screentime, and has received investment from Screen Australia and Film Victoria. The episodes have been written by Claire Phillips, Christine Bartlett, Ian Meadows, Ainslie Clouston, and Mithila Gupta, with Sian Davies, Scott Major, and Tori Garrett directing.

In May 2018, it was announced Madeleine West, Cece Peters, Annie Maynard, and Olympia Valance, had been cast as the wives and girlfriends. West plays Kath Rickards, who is married to the coach and acts as a "mentor and den mother." Peters plays Paige Dunkeley, a high school teacher who follows her boyfriend to the city. Maynard was cast as Maddy Cochrane, a lawyer and a mother of two. Valance is socialite Tahlia Woods, who is engaged to the captain of the Southern Jets. Of securing her role, Valance stated "When I read the script, I just knew that I had to play Tahlia. I was determined this character would be mine." The following month, Isabella Giovinazzo was cast as Jessie Davies, a former footballer married to one of the club's players.

Jeremy Lindsay Taylor, Jackson Gallagher, Kevin Hofbauer, George Pullar, James Mason, and Ethan Panizza also joined the ensemble cast. Taylor is the team's coach Brian Rickards, Gallagher plays Tahlia's fiancé Connor Marrello, Hofbauer is an "admired club veteran" Travis Cochrane, while Pullar, Mason and Panizza portray footballers Daniel Fletcher, Jack Davies, and Rusty O'Reilly respectively. Paul Ireland was cast as Andrew Macleish, the president of the Southern Jets. Of the casting process, Maier stated "This has been one of the most comprehensive casting calls we've done. The key roles dictate strong, independent, fascinating women. We think Nathan Lloyd and the team at Screentime have done a brilliant job securing a cast of this calibre."

Filming for the show began on 4 June 2018 in Melbourne. The eight-part series began airing on 19 September 2018 on Network Ten and WIN Television. The first episode was available to view one week early on the catch-up service 10Play.

On 14 November 2018, Network 10 announced the show had been renewed for a second season. It began airing on 16 October 2019. The first two episodes are directed by Major. Season 2 is set six months after the season 1 finale, and sees the club welcome a new player Liam Flynn (Ben Chapple) and his girlfriend Kendall Pereira (Jess Bush).

The series was officially cancelled in February 2021 after failing to be picked up for a third season.

Cast

 Madeleine West as Kath Rickards
 Annie Maynard as Maddy Cochrane
 Cece Peters as Paige Dunkeley
 Olympia Valance as Tahlia Woods
 Isabella Giovinazzo as Jessie Davies
 Jeremy Lindsay Taylor as Brian Rickards
 George Pullar as Daniel Fletcher
 Jackson Gallagher as Connor Marrello
 Kevin Hofbauer as Travis Cochrane
 Ethan Panizza as Rusty O'Reilly
 James Mason as Jack Davies
 Ben Chapple as Liam Flynn
 Jess Bush as Kendall Pereira
 Paul Ireland as Andrew Macleish
 Miriama Smith as Dr Lauren Gambi
 Alicia Banit as Karlie Lum
 Georgina Naidu as Toni Chadha
 Nick Russell as Brody Schneider
 Christopher Brown as Neil Murray 
 Tom O'Sullivan as Nate Sabo
 Kasia Kaczmarek as Joanna Zielinksi
 Alison Whyte as Diane Marrello

 Alex Williams as Shane Manrara

Episodes

Season 1 (2018)

Season 2 (2019)

Spin-offs
In September 2018, Network 10 launched a spin-off web series alongside the first season called The Goss Boss (or TGB) on TenPlay. A new episode became available shortly after Playing for Keeps aired that week. The Goss Boss is a fictional gossip show that covers the feuds and fashions featured in Playing for Keeps, and is hosted by Liv Phyland. General manager of digital at Network 10, Liz Baldwin stated: "In addition to our regular behind-the-scenes cast interviews, we created a fun web series that explores the Playing For Keeps storyline in more detail, giving fans of the show the chance to see what it would be like in the real world for the characters on the show. It's a grandstand exposé into Playing For Keeps''' real power players: the WAGs."

On 30 October 2019, Network 10 launched a new web series for season two called Sidelines on 10 Play, which was sponsored by Volvo Cars. Each webisode follows the characters during different activities in a car ride.

Reception
Jessica Multari of TV Week called the series "a new TV obsession". Multari found that "there's more to Ten's new Aussie series than socialites swanning around in stilettos supporting their sports star husbands. Scratch the surface and you'll find secrets, betrayal, deceit and heartache." Praising the character of Paige, Multari said she won the audience over with her country charm and stole all of the scenes she was in.

Bridget McManus of The Sydney Morning Herald also gave the series a positive response, writing "This is the Aussie Rules WAG drama that was begging to be made. With a murder mystery blighting the start of the season and rumours and innuendo flying like the proverbial at the ceiling fan, it's a story that could have been lifted straight from a gossip site."The Age's Karl Quinn said the show's "most obvious comparison is Footballers' Wives, the hysterically over-the-top soapie about English soccer WAGs. But while it has its share of funny moments, Playing For Keeps is a far more sober – and certainly less snarky – affair."

Home media
The first season of Playing for Keeps'' was released on DVD via Roadshow Entertainment.

References

External links
 
 

Australian drama television series
Network 10 original programming
2018 Australian television series debuts
2019 Australian television series endings
Television shows set in Melbourne
English-language television shows
Television series by All3Media
Television series by Screentime